Erving Goffman (1922–1982) was a Canadian sociologist

Goffman may also refer to: 

 Alice Goffman, American sociologist (and daughter of Erving Goffman)
 Andrew Goffman, American actor and author
 Barb Goffman, American mystery short-story writer
 Casper Goffman, American mathematician
 Daniel Goffman, American historian and author
 Irwin William Goffman, American sociologist
 Ken Goffman (R. U. Sirius), American writer, musician and cyberculture celebrity
 Lindsay Goffman, American film and television production company executive with 3AD
 Mark Goffman, American television writer and producer
 Frances Goffman Bay, Canadian American character actress (and sister of Erving Goffman)
 John William Gofman, American scientist and Chair, Committee for Nuclear Responsibility
 William Goffman, American mathematical information scientist